The Uzbekistan Hockey Federation is the governing body of field hockey in Uzbekistan. It is affiliated to IHF International Hockey Federation and AHF Asian Hockey Federation. The headquarters of the federation are in Tashkent.

Bakhodir Akhmedov is the President of the Uzbekistan Hockey Federation and Sunnatulla Yuldashev is the General Secretary.

See also
 Uzbekistan men's national field hockey team
 Uzbekistan women's national field hockey team

References

External links
 Uzbekistan Hockey Federation

Uzbekistan
Hockey
Field hockey in Uzbekistan